Unity Band is a studio album by American jazz guitarist Pat Metheny along with saxophonist Chris Potter, bassist Ben Williams and drummer Antonio Sánchez. This is the first Metheny album featuring a tenor saxophonist in 32 years (since 1980's 80/81 with the late Michael Brecker). The album was released through Nonesuch Records on June 12, 2012 and received the Grammy Award for Best Jazz Instrumental Album during the 2013 Grammy Awards, marking Metheny's 20th Grammy win.

Track listing

Personnel
 Pat Metheny – electric and acoustic guitars, guitar synthesizer, orchestrionics
 Chris Potter – tenor and soprano saxophone, bass clarinet
 Ben Williams – double bass
 Antonio Sánchez – drums

Charts

Awards
Grammy Awards

References

Pat Metheny albums
2012 albums
Nonesuch Records albums
Instrumental albums
Grammy Award for Best Jazz Instrumental Album